Huntsville Township may refer to the following townships in the United States:

 Huntsville Township, Polk County, Minnesota
 Huntsville Township, Schuyler County, Illinois